Natascha Keller (born 3 July 1977 in West Berlin) is a German retired field hockey striker. She won a gold medal as a member of the German team at the 2004 Summer Olympics. She also competed at the 1996 Summer Olympics, 2000 Summer Olympics, 2008 Summer Olympics and 2012 Summer Olympics. In 1999 she received an award from the International Hockey Federation.

She is the daughter of retired Olympic field hockey player Carsten Keller and granddaughter of player Erwin Keller. Her brothers Andreas Keller and Florian Keller, like her father and herself, were on gold medal winning field hockey teams.

Keller has accumulated over 400 games for the Germany women's national field hockey team, which makes her the country's most capped female player in history. Keller was the flag bearer for Germany at the 2012 Summer Olympics, becoming the first field hockey athlete being honoured this way.

Literature
 National Olympics Committee for Germany: Die deutsche Olympiamannschaft. Athen 2004. Frankfurt am Main 2004

References

External links
 

1977 births
Living people
German female field hockey players
Olympic field hockey players of Germany
Field hockey players at the 1996 Summer Olympics
Field hockey players at the 2000 Summer Olympics
Field hockey players at the 2004 Summer Olympics
Field hockey players at the 2008 Summer Olympics
Olympic gold medalists for Germany
Field hockey players from Berlin
People from East Berlin
Olympic medalists in field hockey
Field hockey players at the 2012 Summer Olympics
Medalists at the 2004 Summer Olympics
Recipients of the Order of Merit of Berlin
20th-century German women
21st-century German women